Jason Wang may refer to:
 Ling Wancheng (born c. 1960), Chinese businessperson
 Wang Shih-hsien (born 1968), Taiwanese singer and actor